DC Shoes is an American company that specializes in footwear for action sports, including skateboarding and snowboarding. The company also manufactures apparel, bags, accessories, hats, tshirts, and posters.

History
The company was founded in June 1994 by Damon Way, Ken Block and Clayton Blehm. It was originally based in Carlsbad, California, but is now based in Huntington Beach, California, United States. DC originally stood for "Droors Clothing", but since the sale of Droors Clothing, DC no longer has ties to Droors and is simply DC Shoes, Inc.

On March 8, 2004, DC Shoes was acquired by Quiksilver in an $87 million transaction. In 2010, DC Shoes moved from Vista, California, to Quiksilver's headquarters in Huntington Beach.
A video entitled Skateboarding Is Forever was released online in 2010 and featured parts from the amateur DC skateboard team at the time: Marquise Henry, Matt Miller, Wes Kremer, Evan Smith, and Greg Myers. Apart from Myers and Henry, all of the skateboarders from the video remained sponsored by the company in 2013, and have since attained professional status.

In 2011, the brand underwent a rejuvenation process that included the design of a new flag logo. As part of this process, new skateboard team announcements were progressively made and a series of advertisements, under the direction of new team member Steve Berra, were released online. The other new team announcements were Mikey Taylor, Mike Mo Capaldi, Nyjah Huston, Chris Cole, and Davis Torgerson. Felipe Gustavo was introduced at a later stage.

A progression of the brand relaunch was the "Rediscovery" campaign that commenced in December 2011, following the addition of Capaldi and Huston to the skateboard team. 

Co-founder Block died in a snowmobile crash in January 2023.

Skateboarding team

Global professionals
Evan Smith
Josh Kalis
Youra Huston 
Matt Miller
Wes Kremer
Danny Way
Brian Wenning
Thaynan Costa
Madars Apse 
Tommy fynn
Thomas Kitchenham
John Shanahan
Ish Cepeda

Former
Colin McKay
Rob Dyrdek
Ryan Gallant
Mike Carroll
Anthony Van Engelen
Stevie Williams
Austin Richardson
Rick Howard
Keith Hufnagel
Steve Polychronopolus
Moses Itkonen
Rudy Johnson
Scott Johnson
Caine Gayle
Carl Shipman
Nyjah Huston
Mikey Taylor
Mike Mo Capaldi
Felipe Gustavo
Chris Cole
Tiago Lemos
Tristan Funkhouser

Global amateurs
Zerish Hebron

Arell Peredas
Cedryk Catalon

Regional teams
Similar to other larger brands, such as Nike, Inc. and Adidas, DC sponsors regional teams in addition to its global team. Initially, national teams, such as the DC Shoes China team, DC Shoes Spain team, DC Shoes Norway, and DC Shoes Australia were formed, but in 2013 the various skate teams seem to have been merged and united under regional titles. However, as of July 2013, DC Shoes Canada has not been officially disbanded and the team consists of Morgan Smith, Josh Clark, Sascha Daley, Micky Papa, Paul Trep, Will Marshall, Mitch Barrette, Bobby Dekyzer, and Chad Dickson. Additionally, as of September 2013, a UK "National" team exists, and consists of Conhuir Lynn, Dave Snaddon, Sean Smith, Dylan Hughes, and Nicky Howells.

As of September 2013, the DC Shoes Europe team consists of Madars Apse, Josef Skott Jatta, Thaynan Costa, Michael Sommer, Javier Paredes, Bruno Aballay, Antony Lopez, Ruben Garcia, and Manuel Margreiter. In late 2012, an Asia Pacific (DC APAC) team superseded the Australian team and will presumably incorporate skateboarders from the Chinese team, such as Taiwan pro Adee Lu, as well as other parts of the Asia-Pacific region. Tommy Fynn was introduced as the first member of DC's APAC skate team, followed by fellow Australian Jake Hayes, whose welcome video part was published on the Internet in April 2013.

As of November 1, 2014, the regional teams were no longer listed on the company's websites.

Snow team

Global professionals
Devun Walsh
Torstein Horgmo
Iikka Backstrom
Mons Roisland
Sebbe De Buck
Travis Rice
Jordan Morse
Brady Lem
Justin Fronius
Anto Chamberland
Jonathan Lindhe

Former
 Bjorn Leines
Todd Richards (snowboarder)
Nate Cole
Lauri Heiskari
Aaron Biitner
Max Tokunaga 
J.P. Walker
Gabe Crane
Ryan Tiene
Mons Roisland
Torstein Horgmo

Moto team

Professional
Thomas Pagès
Ryan Villopoto
Travis Pastrana
Jeremy McGrath
Robbie Maddison
Nate Adams
Andre Villa
Trey Canard
Kyle Regal
PJ Larsen
Adam Cianciarulo
Jeffrey Herlings
James Stewart Jr.

Former
Ricky Carmichael
Jeff Emig
 Mike Cinqmars
 Ryan Hughes
Jimmy Button
Adam Jones
Malcolm Stewart
Jason Anderson
Ryan Morais
Martin Davalos
Josh Hill
Justin Hill
Davi Millsaps
Broc Tickle
Ian Trettel
Zack Bell
Nico Izzi
Tommy Searle
Jolene Van Vugt
Matt Moss
Max Anstie

Amateur
Carson Mumford
Chase Bell

National professionals
Tyler Bereman
Chris Plouffe
Mitch Alcorn

Auto Team
Travis Pastrana
Dave Mirra

Surf Team
On June 15, 2016 DC Shoes introduced their new global surf team marking the return of the DC Shoes Surfing platform since 2003.

Current
Bruce Irons
Ezekiel Lau
Kanoa Igrashi
Leonardo Fioravanti

Former
Shane Dorian 
Andy Irons

Past Teams

BMX
Chad Kagy
Dave Mirra
Robbie Miranda
Broc Raiford
Chris Doyle
Colin Winkelmann
Jerry Bagley
Dylan Stark
Edwin De La Rosa
Alfredo Mancuso
Neal Wood
Rob Wise
Anthony Napolitan
Mike "Hucker" Clark
Corey Bohan
Jeremiah Smith
Stevie Churchill
Kelly Bolton
Biz
Brett Banasiewicz
Robbie Morales
Daniel Dhers
Dylan Clayton

See also
Dave Mirra Endorsement
Rob Dyrdek
Plan B Skateboards
Extreme Sports

References

External links

Shoe brands
Surfwear brands
Skateboarding companies
Snowboarding companies
Outdoor clothing brands
Clothing companies established in 1994
1990s fashion
2000s fashion
2010s fashion
Skateboard shoe companies
Shoe companies of the United States
Companies that filed for Chapter 11 bankruptcy in 2015